Copenhagen University Hospital is a conglomerate of several hospitals in Region Hovedstaden and Region Sjælland in Denmark, together with the Faculty of Health and Medical Sciences at the University of Copenhagen.

List of member hospitals
In Region Hovedstaden
Region Hovedstadens Psykiatri
Amager Hospital
Bispebjerg Hospital
Bornholms Hospital
Frederiksberg Hospital
Gentofte Hospital
Glostrup Hospital
Herlev Hospital
Frederikssund Hospital
Helsingør Hospital
Hillerød Hospital
Hvidovre Hospital
Rigshospitalet
In Region Sjælland
Fakse Sygehus
Holbæk Sygehus
Kalundborg Sygehus
Køge Sygehus
Roskilde Sygehus
Nakskov Sygehus
Nykøbing F. Sygehus
Næstved Sygehus
Ringsted Sygehus
Slagelse Sygehus

Steno Diabetes Center is an affiliate member of the University Hospital.

Hospitals in Denmark
Hospital networks